Fifth Column Films is a UK film production company best known for feature documentaries Way of the Morris and TEMPEST.

Early films
Established in 2006, their first project was fiction drama The Boat People, starring Raquel Cassidy and Nabil Elouahabi. They proceeded to make the UK Film Council funded short film Domestics in 2008, which premiered at the Edinburgh International Film Festival. The same year, their microfilm Slaphappy, directed by Tim Plester won best film at the Belfast Film Festival in the 15 second category.

Feature documentaries
In 2011, they had their first major breakthrough with Way of the Morris, a feature documentary by Tim Plester and Rob Curry, about Tim's Morris Dancing village in Oxfordshire. The film premiered at SXSW in 2011, before being released in UK cinemas that summer. The following year, they followed it up with TEMPEST, a feature documentary directed by Rob Curry and Anthony Fletcher. The company self-distributed both films in UK cinemas, an unusual achievement for a small independent production company.

Future work
The company is currently in production on a feature documentary about folk singer Shirley Collins, and a fiction short, Truck, which has been commissioned by Creative England and the BFI..

Productions

References

External links
 Fifth Column Films website
 Boat People official website
 Way of the Morris official website
 TEMPEST official website
 Ballad of Shirley Collins official website

Film production companies of the United Kingdom
Mass media in London